Evelyne Kestemberg-Hassin (28 May 1918 – 17 April 1989) was a French psychoanalyst. She was born in Constantinople to a Turkish father and a Russian-Jewish mother, and died in Paris. She was a former president and full member of the Paris Psychoanalytical Society, known by its French acronym SPP.

Biography
Kestemberg moved to Paris with her family shortly after birth. She left occupied France in 1942 to move to Casablanca, where she met and later married Jean Kestemberg, before they left together for Mexico. 

She was a trained philosopher as well as a psychoanalyst. She was first analysed by Marc Schlumberger and decided to dedicate her life to psychoanalysis. She was tutored by Sacha Nacht, who was against her admission to the SPP given she was not a trained physician. She became the first woman who was not a medical doctor to be admitted in 1963.

References

Further reading 

 

1918 births
1989 deaths
French psychoanalysts
French psychologists
French women psychologists
20th-century psychologists
20th-century French women
Emigrants from the Ottoman Empire to France